For details on climate change in East Asia, please see:

 Climate change in China
 Climate change in Japan
 Climate change in North Korea
 Climate change in South Korea
 Climate change in Mongolia
 Climate change in Taiwan

East Asia
Environment of East Asia